The Bank of Tracy is a historic commercial building in Tracy, California, completed in 1920. It was added to the National Register of Historic Places in 1980.

History
The Bank of Tracy opened in 1909, the first bank established in the town. The bank moved into its new building in 1920. The site chosen for the new building had been a livery stable owned by George Cox. 

The building was designed by noted architect W. H. Weeks. The two-story bank building and adjoining one-story commercial unit measure . The commercial wing is divided into 4 stores.

The Bank of Tracy was purchased by The American Bank of Oakland in February 1923. The American Bank later became the American Trust Company, and in 1947 moved to a different building. The bank portion of the building was vacant for years, although some offices on the second floor and adjacent commercial units were occupied.

The building was renovated in 1978 and renamed Central Plaza. During the renovation, the original light fixtures, back stair, bathroom fixtures, and second floor wood trim and hardware were found to be salvageable.

References

		
National Register of Historic Places in San Joaquin County, California
Neoclassical architecture in California
Buildings and structures completed in 1920
1920 establishments in California
W. H. Weeks buildings